Joggers may refer to: 
 The band The Joggers
 Sweatpants, long trousers used for exercise or as casual wear (British English)